Charandas is a 1977 Bollywood film directed by B.S. Thapa, starring Om Prakash, Urmila Bhatt, Lakshmi, Vikram Makandar, Farida Jalal and Raj Mehra, in lead roles.

Synopsis 
The entire plot is woven around Indian family values, enterprise and meteoric rise in business.

Charandas lives with his dutiful, religious wife Kamla and their two children, running a mechanic workshop that over a span of 10 years, becomes an engineering empire.  Soon money clouds the eyes of his family members, to the extent that his dutiful wife and loving children are transformed into bad-mannered party animals, even holding parties to celebrate the birthday and marriage of their dog.  Shocked by their change in behavior, Charandas leaves his home for hotels and factory rest houses.  Lonely housewife Lalli accidentally meets Charandas in a distraught state, having been abandoned by her mean and selfish husband Ashokh, a small-time stage actor living with his mistress Sheetal.  Charandas and Lalli decide to teach their respective family members a lesson and team up to act as a lovey dovey couple, Lalli spoilt by numerous shopping extravaganzas and holiday trips to places like Kashmir, and Charandas as the doting lover.

Sheetal drives away Vikram from her home, seeing his dubious standards of introducing his wife Laxmi as his maid servant. Meanwhile, Kamla invites Vikram to move into Charandas' mansion and sues Charandas with the help of Vikram and family friend Aslam.  They scheme to hire a photographer, Pinto, to prove that Charandas has become mentally ill, and take over his business empire. However, Charandas spoils the scheme by bequeathing his entire empire to his workers as shareholders.  He also reveals that he had taken Lalli only to be a daughter, which was misunderstood due to the mentality of their cheating spouses.

The story ends with both families reunited and Indian celluloid themes being typified once again.

Cast 

The cast is a throwback on the hit debut film in Hindi of Lakshmi, namely Chattakkari (1974 film), which was the first Malayalam film to run continuously for 40 weeks in Bangalore, and was remade in Hindi as Julie (1975 film) and in Telugu as Miss Julie Prema Katha (1975). The famous song number, "My Heart is Beating", sung by Preeti Sagar, had catapulted Laxmi to fame on the Hindi screen and starred both Laxmi and Om Prakash, with Vikram as the beau.

Om Prakash as Charandas
Urmila Bhatt as Charandas's wife, Kamla.
Lakshmi (actress) as Lalli
 Vikram Makandar as Ashokh
Amitabh Bachchan ...  Qawwali Singer (Special Appearance)
Dharmendra ...  Qawwali Singer (Special Appearance)
Sunil Dutt as Lawyer Tandon in court case
Manorama as Anglo-Indian mother of six daughters
Farida Jalal as Vilasiya
Raj Mehra as Aslam

Soundtrack 
The music was composed by Rajesh Roshan and the songs were written by Rajinder Krishan.

References

External links 
 

Films scored by Rajesh Roshan
1977 films
1970s Hindi-language films